Zeurrora is a genus of moths in the family Cossidae. It contains only species, Zeurrora indica, is found in India, China, Bangladesh and on Peninsular Malaya and Java, as well as in New Guinea.

References

Natural History Museum Lepidoptera generic names catalog

Zeuzerinae